John George Vanderbilt Henry Spencer-Churchill, 11th Duke of Marlborough,  (13 April 1926 – 16 October 2014) was a British peer. He was the elder son of the 10th Duke of Marlborough and his wife, the Hon. Alexandra Mary Hilda Cadogan. He was known as "Sunny" after his courtesy title of Earl of Sunderland.

His principal seat was Blenheim Palace, Woodstock, Oxfordshire. He was ranked 224th in the Sunday Times Rich List 2004, with an estimated wealth of £185 million. His death was announced on 16 October 2014 by Blenheim Palace.

Life and work
He was educated at Eton College and served seven years in the Life Guards, in which he achieved the rank of captain. In 1972, on inheriting the Dukedom of Marlborough, he assumed the management of Blenheim Palace and the Blenheim estate.

To fund the maintenance of the house, he opened it to visitors and as a film set, and established a number of businesses, including a garden furniture company and a water bottling plant.

He was also active in a range of organisations, including the Thames and Chilterns Tourist Board and Oxford United Football Club. He served as vice-president of the Witney Conservative Association, the local party of David Cameron.

Marriages and issue
Marlborough was married four times and had a total of six children, two of whom died in infancy.

Firstly, he married Susan Mary Hornby (1929–2005), daughter of Michael Charles St John Hornby and Nicolette Joan Ward, on 19 October 1951. They divorced in 1961 after having three children:

 John David Ivor Spencer-Churchill, Earl of Sunderland (17 November 1952 – 14 May 1955), a godson of Princess Margaret
 Charles James Spencer-Churchill, 12th Duke of Marlborough (24 November 1955); married, firstly, Rebecca Few-Brown on 24 February 1990. They have one son, George, and were divorced in 1998. In 2002, he married Edla Griffiths, with whom he has two children.
 Lady Henrietta Mary Spencer-Churchill (7 October 1958); married German banker Nathan Gelber in 1980 and they were divorced in 1989. They have two sons.

Secondly, on 23 October 1961, he married Athina Onassis (née Livanos), former wife of Aristotle Onassis, and daughter of Stavros Livanos. They were divorced in March 1971 and had no children.

Thirdly, on 20 May 1972, he married Countess Rosita Douglas-Stjernorp, daughter of ambassador Count Carl Douglas-Stjernorp and Ottora Haas-Heye. They had three children and were divorced in 2008.

 Lord Richard Spencer-Churchill (born and died 1973)
 Lord Edward Albert Charles Spencer-Churchill (born 1974); married Kimberly Hammerstroem. They had a civil ceremony at Mayfair Library in London on 4 July 2018, followed by a religious ceremony at Blenheim Palace on 7 July. They have a child Phoenix Spencer-Churchill.
 Lady Alexandra Elizabeth Spencer-Churchill (born 1977)

Finally, at the age of 82, Marlborough married Lily Mahtani (née Sahni; born c. 1954–57 in Iran) 3 December 2008 in the Private Chapel at Blenheim. There were no children from this marriage.

Titles and appointments

Titles
 Earl of Sunderland (1926–1934)
 Marquess of Blandford (1934–1972)
 His Grace The Duke of Marlborough (1972–2014)

Appointments
Justice of the Peace
Deputy Lieutenant of Oxfordshire

Arms

References

External links

Cast of Branagh's Hamlet
James Reginato. "Magnificent Obsession" Vanity Fair June 2011

1926 births
2014 deaths
Cadogan family
Deputy Lieutenants of Oxfordshire
111
English justices of the peace
English people of American descent
English people of Dutch descent
Hornby family
People educated at Eton College
John Spencer-Churchill, 11th Duke of Marlborough
John Spencer-Churchill, 11th Duke of
British Life Guards officers
Marlborough